Chen Cheng-siang (1922 – 2003) was a Chinese geographer from the Republic of China.

He was Professor of Geography and Director of the Geographical Research Center at the Chinese University of Hong Kong and Taiwan University of Republic of China. He wrote the entry on China for Encyclopædia Britannica.

Works
Taiwan: An Economic and Social Geography (台灣地誌)
Economic geography and geology of Guangdong province (廣東地誌, Cosmo book shop, Hong Kong, 1978) 
Yangtze River and Yellow River (長江與黃河, Commercial Press Publishing House, Hong Kong, December 1978 )

References

1922 births
2003 deaths
Chinese geographers
Academic staff of the National Taiwan University
Academic staff of the Chinese University of Hong Kong
Scientists from Wenzhou
Taiwanese people from Zhejiang
Chinese expatriates in Italy
Educators from Wenzhou
Writers from Wenzhou
20th-century geographers
Chinese expatriates in Taiwan
Chinese expatriates in British Hong Kong